Nieuw-Helvoet is a former village in the Dutch province of South Holland. It is now a neighbourhood in the north of the town of Hellevoetsluis.

Nieuw-Helvoet was a separate municipality until 1960, when it became part of Hellevoetsluis. In 1855, Oude en Nieuwe Struiten had merged into Nieuw-Helvoet.

References

Former municipalities of South Holland
Populated places in South Holland
Voorne aan Zee